Andrew Freemantle (22 October 1768 at Bishops Sutton, Hampshire – 19 January 1837 at Easton, Hampshire) was an English cricketer who played for Hampshire during the Hambledon Era and afterwards.  He was a left-handed batsman, a noted fielder and an occasional wicket-keeper.
 
Freemantle made his known debut in the 1788 season and had 136 known appearances in major matches to the 1810 season. He played for the Players in the inaugural and second Gentlemen v Players matches in 1806.

His brother John Freemantle was an earlier Hambledon player.

References

External links

Sources
 
 
 

1768 births
1837 deaths
English cricketers
English cricketers of 1787 to 1825
Hampshire cricketers
Players cricketers
Hambledon cricketers
Kent cricketers
Surrey cricketers
Left-Handed v Right-Handed cricketers
Old Westminsters cricketers
T. Mellish's XI cricketers
R. Leigh's XI cricketers
Hampshire and Marylebone Cricket Club cricketers